University Health Truman Medical Center, previously Truman Medical Center–Hospital Hill (abbreviated TMC Hospital Hill), is an 238-bed acute care and outpatient hospital located in Kansas City, Missouri.

Hospital background
The origins of University Health Truman Medical Center began in 1870 with the construction of General Hospital at 22nd Street and McCoy Avenue (now Kenwood Avenue) in Kansas City. Voters approved a bond issue in 1903 to fund the construction of a new larger General Hospital because the 175-bed hospital was deemed insufficient for the growing city. In 1905, Thomas Swope donated 4.5 acres of land on Gillham Road between 23rd and 24th Streets, and in 1908, the new 600-bed General Hospital opened. A new racially segregated hospital was built in 1930, with new General Hospital No. 1 being for white patients and old General Hospital No. 2 becoming the "colored division". The hospitals merged in 1957, and the newly integrated hospital eventually became the teaching hospital for the newly established University of Missouri-Kansas City (UMKC) Medical School. The hospital officially opened at its present-day location in 1976. In 2021, the hospital changed its name from Truman Medical Center-Hospital Hill to University Health Truman Medical Center.

University Health Truman Medical Center has one of the busiest adult emergency departments (EDs) in the Kansas City metropolitan area with more than 60,000 visits a year. It is located in Downtown Kansas City, across from Children's Mercy Hospital and connected via a skybridge, having access for pediatric transfers when necessary.

The hospital is affiliated with the University of Missouri–Kansas City (UMKC) School of Medicine and provides training base for its four- and six-year medical programs.

The facility is equipped with diverse fields of services including ED, general surgery, orthopedic surgery, cardiology, and radiology.

See also
  – A WWF match at Kemper Arena, in which a wrestler fell and was transported to TMC, but later died from his injuries
  – More information about the same accident
 University Health Lakewood Medical Center

References

External links

 

1870 establishments in Missouri
Buildings and structures in Kansas City, Missouri
Hospitals in Kansas City, Missouri